Lexi Lawson is an American actress and singer, best known for her work in musicals. She held the lead female roles in touring productions of Rent and In the Heights. Lawson made her Broadway debut as Eliza Hamilton in Hamilton.

Early life
Lexi Lawson was born and raised in the Bronx in New York City. When she was seven, she moved with her family to Newburgh, New York.

Career
In 2010 she joined the touring company of Rent when she was cast as Mimi Marquez for the North American tour. She had become a finalist on the eighth season of American Idol but chose to drop out in order to tour with Rent. Shortly prior to her contract coming to an end, she expressed an interest in the role of Vanessa in Lin-Manuel Miranda's musical In the Heights. She was subsequently cast in the part in the United States national tour.

Lawson made her Broadway debut when she was announced as replacing Phillipa Soo in the role of Eliza Hamilton in Miranda's Hamilton. Her first performance took place on July 9, 2016. On February 12, 2017, she joined with other former cast members of Rent to perform a tribute to the musical entitled "Seasons of Love" at The Cutting Room in New York City.

Lawson recorded the single "The Christmas Song (Chestnuts Roasting on an Open Fire)", which was released in December 2017. That same month, she was present for the unveiling of the restored bust of Alexander Hamilton at the Museum of the City of New York alongside fellow cast member Anthony Lee Medina. She teamed up with four other Eliza actresses from Hamilton productions on Miranda's Hamildrops in 2018. The track, "First Burn", featured Lawson along with Julia K. Harriman, Shoba Narayan, Rachelle Ann Go, and Arianna Afsar. Miranda explained on Twitter that the song was the original version of a song sung by Eliza in the musical.

Personal life
Lawson is married to actor Leonidas Gulaptis; they have one child together. She owns a Yorkshire Terrier named Seven. She bought the dog from a breeder in 2008, and would take it with her as she toured the US on the productions of Rent and In The Heights. In late 2016, she moved into an apartment near Times Square, New York City.

Theatre credits

Filmography

References

External links
 
 

20th-century American actresses
20th-century American women singers
20th-century American singers
21st-century American actresses
21st-century American women singers
21st-century American singers
Actresses from New York City
American film actresses
American musical theatre actresses
American television actresses
Broadway theatre people
Living people
Newburgh Free Academy alumni
Musicians from the Bronx
People from Midtown Manhattan
People from Newburgh, New York
Year of birth missing (living people)